Gauldal Billag is a Norwegian bus operator operating in the municipalities of Røros, Holtålen and Midtre Gauldal in Sør-Trøndelag. The company also operates express buses to Trondheim and Oppdal and cooperates with Østerdal Billag on a NOR-WAY express bus between Trondheim and Oslo. The company has its headquarters in Røros.

The company also has 25 trucks that are operated for Schenker. It also operates a workshop in Røros and offers charter tours. The company was founded in 1966 and is owned by the municipalities of Holtålen, Midtre Gauldal and Røros, and TrønderBilene (39%).

References

External links
Official website

Transport companies established in 1966
Transport companies disestablished in 2010
1966 establishments in Norway
Fosen Trafikklag
Bus companies of Trøndelag